Francisco Javier Bermejo Caballero (born 9 March 1955) is a Spanish footballer who played as a midfielder for Atlético Madrid. He competed in the men's tournament at the 1976 Summer Olympics.

References

Living people
1955 births
Sportspeople from Badajoz
Footballers from Extremadura
Spanish footballers
Association football midfielders
Olympic footballers of Spain
Footballers at the 1976 Summer Olympics
Atlético Madrid footballers